Jair Amador Silos (born 21 August 1989), simply known as Jair, is a Portuguese footballer who plays for Segunda División club Real Zaragoza as a central defender. Born in Portugal, he holds Spanish citizenship.

Club career

Early career
Born in São Jorge de Arroios, Lisbon, Jair never knew his parents (who were Cape Verdian) and was adopted by a Spanish family, moving to Villanueva de la Serena, Badajoz, Extremadura afterwards. A UD La Cruz Villanovense youth graduate, he made his debut as a senior with CD Hernán Cortés in 2008, on loan from CF Villanovense.

Jair appeared rarely for Villanovense in 2010–11, and was loaned to CD Miajadas in Tercera División in the 2011 summer. He remained with the side for two years, being brought back to his parent club in July 2013 after it was relegated from Segunda División B.

Jair was a regular starter during the 2013–14 campaign, as the club returned to the third level at first attempt. On 6 July 2015 he signed for Levante UD, being assigned to the reserves also in the third division.

Huesca
On 24 June 2016, Jair signed a two-year contract with Segunda División club SD Huesca. He made his professional debut on 20 August, starting in a 0–0 away draw against AD Alcorcón.

Jair scored his first professional goal on 2 December 2017, netting his team's second in a 3–1 home win against Córdoba CF. He finished the campaign as an undisputed starter, featuring in all league matches and scoring four goals as his side achieved a first-ever promotion to La Liga.

Maccabi Tel Aviv
On 7 June 2018, Jair signed a three-year contract with Israeli Premier League side Maccabi Tel Aviv FC. In his first season, he helped the club win a domestic double, but only featured regularly in his second, as his side retained the league trophy.

Zaragoza
On 19 August 2020, Jair returned to Spain and its second division, after agreeing to a two-year deal with Real Zaragoza.

Honours
Maccabi Tel Aviv
 Israeli Premier League: 2018–19, 2019–20
 Toto Cup: 2018–19

References

External links

1989 births
Living people
Footballers from Lisbon
Adoptees
Naturalised citizens of Spain
People from Villanueva de la Serena
Sportspeople from the Province of Badajoz
Footballers from Extremadura
Spanish footballers
Association football central defenders
CF Villanovense players
Atlético Levante UD players
SD Huesca footballers
Real Zaragoza players
Maccabi Tel Aviv F.C. players
Divisiones Regionales de Fútbol players
Tercera División players
Segunda División B players
Segunda División players
Israeli Premier League players
Spanish people of Cape Verdean descent
Spanish sportspeople of African descent
Spanish expatriate footballers
Spanish expatriate sportspeople in Israel
Expatriate footballers in Israel